Lyn Macdonald, (31 May 1929 – 1 March 2021) was a British military historian, one of relatively few women in the field. Macdonald was best known for a series of books on the First World War that draw on first hand accounts of surviving veterans.

Macdonald lived near Cambridge, England, and worked as a BBC radio producer until 1973, when she began working on a documentary with the Old Comrades Association of the 13th (Service) Battalion of the Rifle Brigade, who were visiting the battlefields of the Western Front. The first of her influential books took its title, They Called It Passchendaele, from a poem by Siegfried Sassoon. Other works included Somme. In 1988, she led a party of veterans to the Western Front, accompanied by Sebastian Faulks, who was inspired by the experience to write his novel Birdsong.

Macdonald bequeathed an archive of about 600 recordings of interviews with veterans of the First World War to the Imperial War Museum.

Literature
They Called It Passchendaele (1978), an account of the Battle of Passchendaele in 1917.
The Roses of No Man's Land (1980), a chronicle of the war from the neglected viewpoint of the casualties and the medical teams who struggled to save them.
Somme (1983), a history of the legendary and horrifying battle that has haunted the minds of succeeding generations.
1914: The Days of Hope (1987), a vivid account of the first months of the war and winner of the 1987 Yorkshire Post Book of the Year Award.
1914-1918: Voices and Images of the Great War (1988), an illuminating account of the many different aspects of the war.
1915: The Death of Innocence (1993), a brilliant evocation of the year that saw the terrible losses of Aubers Ridge, Loos, Neuve Chapelle, Ypres and Gallipoli.
To the Last Man: Spring 1918 (1998), a story of the second battle of the Marne.
At the Going Down of the Sun, 365 soldiers from the Great War. Co-writer with Ian Connerty, Sir Martin Gilbert, Peter Hart, Lyn MacDonald and Nigel Steel, Lannoo, Tielt, 2001.

References

Historians of World War I
BBC radio producers
British military writers
British military historians
1929 births
2021 deaths
20th-century British historians
21st-century British historians
Women radio producers